Ambassador Ersin Erçin is a senior Turkish diplomat, with an extensive experience in multilateral diplomacy particularly on matters of international, Euro-Atlantic and Eurasian security, disarmament, and economic and environmental security.

Early life and career
Ersin Erçin has served in a range of positions in the Ministry of Foreign Affairs in Ankara, and in diplomatic missions in Europe, the Middle East, Africa, and Latin America.  He has also earned multiple assignments to represent Turkey at multilateral and security organizations such as the Organisation for Economic Co-operation and Development (OECD) in Paris, the Conference on Security and Cooperation in Europe (CSCE), the Organization for Security and Cooperation in Europe (OSCE) in Vienna, and the United Nations in New York. Erçin has lectured at universities as well as civilian and military groups on the topics of early warning, crisis management, conflict prevention and resolution, and post-conflict rehabilitation.

After joining the Ministry of Foreign Affairs in 1981, Erçin served in the position of Third Secretary in the Department of Economic Relations and later as Second Secretary for the Turkish Permanent Delegation to the OECD in Paris.  From 1989, he continued with consecutive and increasingly senior assignments in Vienna at the CSCE and, later, the newly named OSCE, the largest regional security organization in the world. He served at OSCE as Turkey’s deputy permanent representative from 2001 to 2004.

In 2004, he was selected as Turkey’s Deputy Permanent Representative to the United Nations in New York and later as Minister Counselor for the Ministry’s Department of North and South America.  Earlier in his career, Erçin was posted to the Turkish Embassy in Khartoum, Sudan, with the rank of Second Secretary, and in Damascus, Syria, as Counselor.  In 2009, he was appointed Ambassador to the Federative Republic of Brazil. Ambassador Erçin is a graduate of the Faculty of Political Science, University of Ankara, with a specialization in international relations and organizations.

Chronology

See also 
 Organisation for Economic Co-operation and Development (OECD)
 Organization for Security and Co-operation in Europe (OSCE)
 North Atlantic Treaty Organization (NATO)
 List of diplomatic missions of Turkey

References 

 Statement by Mr. Ersin Erçin, Minister-Counsellor, Deputy Permanent Representative of Turkey to the UN at the 14th Session of Commission on Sustainable Development, New York, 1 May 2006
 Agreed Definition of Term "Terrorism" Said to Be Needed for Consensus on Completing Comprehensive Convention against It, New York, 10 October 2005
 Statement by ERSİN ERÇİN Deputy Permanent Representative of Turkey to the United Nations debate of the first committee general assembly, 60th session New York, 6 October 2005
 14th Session of High Level committee on South-South cooperation, New York, 31 May 2005
 United Nations South-South cooperation for development, 15 June 2005
 OSCE Conference On Globalization, Hofburg, Vienna, 3-4 July 2003 
 Special high-level meeting with the Bretton Woods institutions, the World Trade Organization and the United Nations Conference on Trade and Development New York, 18 April 2005 
 Second Biennial Meeting of States to Consider the Implementation of the Programme of Action to Prevent, Combat and Eradicate the Illicit Trade in Small Arms and Light Weapons in All Its Aspects New York, 11-15 July 2005 
  United Nations General Assembly GA/PAL/973 of 29 November 2004
 UNRWA - Fourth Cttee debate 2 November 2005
 International Day of Solidarity 2004 - Special bulletin ,26 October 2005
 Nuclear-weapon-free zone in the Middle East - First Cttee debate  6 October 2005
 United Nations General Assembly A/AC.183/PV.283 of 29 November 2004
 Third Review Conference of the parties to the convention of the prohibition of the general development, production and stockpiling of bacteriological (biological) and toxin weapons and on their destruction, Geneva, 24 September 1991

External links 
 Ambassador Ersin Erçin's Resume
 Participated Conferences at OSCE
 Participated Conferences at UN

21st-century Turkish diplomats
Ambassadors of Turkey to Brazil
Ambassadors of Turkey to South Korea
Living people
People from Ankara
1958 births